Loynaz is a surname. Notable people with the surname include:

Dulce María Loynaz (1902–1997), Cuban poet
Lope Recio Loynaz (1860–1927), Cuban general